The , also known as the Lamentations of Divergences, is a late 13th century short Buddhist text generally thought to have been written by Yuien, a disciple of Shinran. In the Tannishō, Yuien is concerned about the rising doctrinal divergences that emerged in Jōdo Shinshū Buddhism after the death of their founder, so he wrote down dialogues between himself and Shinran that he could recall when his master was alive.

According to Yuien's own writing in the preface:

Many of the conversations found in the Tannishō are very candid when compared to more formal religious texts, and this may explain some of the popularity of the Tannishō among Shin Buddhists. The Tannishō allows Jōdo Shinshū Buddhists to peer into the mind of Shinran and see how he felt about practicing Jōdo Shinshū. The Tannishō was also a major impetus for the start of The Dobokai Movement among the Higashi Hongwanji branch of Jōdo Shinshū.

Format
The Tannishō is divided into 18 sections (sometimes called chapters), though many of these sections are very short. Some are no longer than a couple of sentences. However, each section deals with a separate doctrinal issue.

Sections 1 through 10 focus on Shinran's thoughts with regard to Jōdo Shinshū, the nembutsu and Amida Buddha, while sections 11 through 18 deal with heretical ideas that Yuien wanted to dispel or correct on the basis of what Shinran had taught him.

References

External links
 The Tannisho - translated by Dr. Taitetsu Unno
Unlocking Tannisho: Shinran's Words on the Pure Land Path, by Kentetsu Takamori, translated by Juliet Winters Carpenter, Ichimannendo Publishing, 2011 
The Path of Acceptance - Commentary on Tannisho, by Rev Josho Adrian Cirlea, Dharma Lion Publication, 2011

Jōdo Shinshū
Buddhist belief and doctrine
Early Middle Japanese texts
Japanese Buddhist texts
Kamakura-period books about Buddhism